Picea abies, the Norway spruce or European spruce, is a species of spruce native to Northern, Central and Eastern Europe.

It has branchlets that typically hang downwards, and the largest cones of any spruce, 9–17 cm long. It is very closely related to the Siberian spruce (Picea obovata), which replaces it east of the Ural Mountains, and with which it hybridizes freely. The Norway spruce has a wide distribution for it being planted for its wood, and is the species used as the main Christmas tree in several countries around the world. It was the first gymnosperm to have its genome sequenced. The Latin specific epithet abies means “like 
Abies, Fir tree”

Description 

The shoots are orange-brown and glabrous. The leaves are needle-like with blunt tips, 12–14 mm long, quadrangular in cross-section, and dark green on all four sides with inconspicuous stomatal lines. The seed cones are 9–17 cm long (the longest of any spruce), and have bluntly to sharply triangular-pointed scale tips. They are green or reddish, maturing brown 5–7 months after pollination. The seeds are black, 4–5 mm long, with a pale brown 15 mm wing.

Range and ecology 
The Norway spruce grows throughout Europe from Norway in the northwest and Poland eastward, and also in the mountains of central Europe, southwest to the western end of the Alps, and southeast in the Carpathians and Balkans to the extreme north of Greece. The northern limit is in the arctic, just north of 70° N in Norway. Its eastern limit in Russia is hard to define, due to extensive hybridization and intergradation with the Siberian spruce, but is usually given as the Ural Mountains. However, trees showing some Siberian spruce characters extend as far west as much of northern Finland, with a few records in northeast Norway. The hybrid is known as Picea × fennica (or P. abies subsp. fennica, if the two taxa are considered subspecies), and can be distinguished by a tendency towards having hairy shoots and cones with smoothly rounded scales.

Norway spruce cone scales are used as food by the caterpillars of the tortrix moth Cydia illutana, whereas Cydia duplicana feeds on the bark around injuries or canker.

Taxonomy 

Populations in southeast Europe tend to have on average longer cones with more pointed scales; these are sometimes distinguished as Picea abies var. acuminata, but there is extensive overlap in variation with trees from other parts of the range.

Some botanists treat Siberian spruce as a subspecies of Norway spruce, though in their typical forms, they are very distinct, the Siberian spruce having cones only 5–10 cm long, with smoothly rounded scales, and pubescent shoots. Genetically Norway and Siberian spruces have turned out to be extremely similar and may be considered as two closely related subspecies of P. abies.

Another spruce with smoothly rounded cone scales and hairy shoots occurs rarely in the Central Alps in eastern Switzerland. It is also distinct in having thicker, blue-green leaves. Many texts treat this as a variant of Norway spruce, but it is as distinct as many other spruces, and appears to be more closely related to Siberian spruce (Picea obovata), Schrenk's spruce (Picea schrenkiana) from central Asia and Morinda spruce (Picea smithiana) in the Himalaya. Treated as a distinct species, it takes the name Alpine spruce (Picea alpestris). As with Siberian spruce, it hybridizes extensively with Norway spruce; pure specimens are rare. Hybrids are commonly known as Norwegian spruce, which should not be confused with the pure species Norway spruce.

Cultivation 
 

 

The Norway spruce is one of the most widely planted spruces, both in and outside of its native range, and one of the most economically important coniferous species in Europe. It is used as an ornamental tree in parks and gardens. It is also widely planted for use as a Christmas tree. Every Christmas, the Norwegian capital city, Oslo, provides the cities of London (the Trafalgar Square Christmas tree), Edinburgh and Washington, D.C., with a Norway spruce, which is placed at the central most square of each city. This is mainly a sign of gratitude for the aid these countries gave during the Second World War.
In North America, Norway spruce is widely planted, specifically in the Northeastern, Pacific Coast, and Rocky Mountain states, as well as in southeastern Canada. It is naturalised in some parts of North America. There are naturalized populations occurring from Connecticut to Michigan, and it is probable that they occur elsewhere. Norway spruces are more tolerant of hot, humid weather than many conifers which do not thrive except in cool-summer areas and they will grow up to USDA Growing Zone 8.

Seed production begins when the tree is in its fourth decade and total lifespan is up to 300 years in its natural range in Europe. Introduced Norway spruces in the British Isles and North America have a much shorter life expectancy. As the tree ages, its crown thins out and lower branches die off.

In the northern US and Canada, Norway spruce is reported as invasive in some locations; however, it does not pose a problem in Zone 6 and up as the seeds have a significantly reduced germination rate in areas with hot, humid summers.

The Norway spruce tolerates acidic soils well, but does not do well on dry or deficient soils. From 1928 until the 1960s it was planted on surface mine spoils in Indiana.

Cultivars 
Several cultivars have been selected as ornamentals (‘Barrya’, ‘Capitata’, ‘Decumbens’, ‘Dumosa’, ‘Clanbrassiliana’, ‘Gregoryana’, ‘Inversa’, ‘Microsperma’, ‘Nidiformis’, ‘Ohlendorffii’, ‘Repens’, ‘Tabuliformis’, ‘Maxwellii’, 'Virgata', 'Inversa', ‘Pendula’), with a wide variety of sizes and shapes, from full-sized forest trees to extremely slow-growing, prostrate forms. They are occasionally traded under the obsolete scientific name Picea excelsa (an illegitimate name). The following cultivars have gained the Royal Horticultural Society's Award of Garden Merit: 

Uses
The Norway spruce is used in forestry for (softwood) timber, and paper production.

It is esteemed as a source of tonewood by stringed-instrument makers. One form of the tree called  (Hazel-spruce) grows in the European Alps and has been recognized by UNESCO as intangible cultural heritage. This form was used by Stradivarius for instruments.

As food
The tree is the source of spruce beer, which was once used to prevent and even cure scurvy. This high vitamin C content can be consumed as a tea from the shoot tips or even eaten straight from the tree when light green and new in spring.

Norway spruce shoot tips have been used in traditional Austrian medicine internally (as syrup or tea) and externally (as baths, for inhalation, as ointments, as resin application or as tea) for treatment of disorders of the respiratory tract, skin, locomotor system, gastrointestinal tract and infections.

During the production of Mont d'Or cheese it is wrapped in a "sangle" made from the cambium of a Norway spruce for about two weeks at least, which gives the cheese a unique flavour.

Longevity 
A press release from Umeå University says that a Norway spruce clone named Old Tjikko, carbon dated as 9,550 years old, is the "oldest living tree". The oldest individual specimen of Norway spruce discovered by tree ring dating found in 2012 in a nature reserve of Buskerud County, Norway was found to be 532 years old.

However, Pando, a stand of 47,000 quaking aspen clones, is estimated to be between 14,000 and one million years old.

The stress is on the difference between the singular "oldest tree" and the multiple "oldest trees", and between "oldest clone" and "oldest non-clone". Old Tjikko is one of a series of genetically identical clones growing from a root system, one part of which is estimated to be 9,550 years old based on carbon dating. The oldest known individual tree (that has not taken advantage of vegetative cloning) is a Great Basin bristlecone pine over 5,000 years old (germination in 3051 BC).

Genetics 
The genome of Picea abies was sequenced in 2013, the first gymnosperm genome to be completely sequenced. The genome contains approximately 20 billion base pairs and is about six times the size of the human genome, despite possessing a similar number of genes. A large proportion of the spruce genome consists of repetitive DNA sequences, including long terminal repeat transposable elements. Despite recent advances in massively parallel DNA sequencing, the assembly of such a large and repetitive genome is a particularly challenging task, mainly from a computational perspective.

Within populations of Picea abies there is great genetic variability, which most likely reflect populations' isolation in glacial  refugia and post-glacial evolutionary history. Genetic diversity can in particular be detected when looking at how the populations respond to climatic conditions. E.g. variations in timing and length of the annual growth period as well as differences in frost-hardiness in spring and autumn. These annual growth patterns are important to recognize in order to choose the proper reforestation material of Picea abies.

Chemistry 
p-Hydroxybenzoic acid glucoside, picein, piceatannol and its glucoside (astringin), isorhapontin (the isorhapontigenin glucoside), catechin and ferulic acid are phenolic compounds found in mycorrhizal and non-mycorrhizal roots of Norway spruces. Piceol and astringin are also found in P. abies.

Research 
Extracts from Picea abies have shown inhibitory activity on porcine pancreatic lipase in vitro.

Synonyms 
Picea abies (L.) H. Karst is the accepted name of this species. More than 150 synonyms of Picea abies have been published.

Homotypic synonyms of Picea abies are:
Pinus abies L.
Abies picea Mill.
Pinus pyramidalis Salisb.
Pinus abies subsp. vulgaris Voss
Abies abies (L.) Druce

Some heterotypic synonyms of Picea abies are:

Abies alpestris Brügger
Abies carpatica (Loudon) Ravenscr.
Abies cinerea Borkh.
Abies clambrasiliana Lavallée
Abies clanbrassiliana P. Lawson
Abies coerulescens K. Koch
Abies conica Lavallée
Abies elegans Sm. ex J.Knight
Abies eremita K.Koch
Abies erythrocarpa (Purk.) Nyman
Abies excelsa (Lam.) Poir.
Abies extrema Th.Fr.
Abies finedonensis Gordon
Abies gigantea Sm. ex Carrière
Abies gregoryana H. Low. ex Gordon
Abies inverta R. Sm. ex Gordon
Abies lemoniana Booth ex Gordon
Abies medioxima C.Lawson
Abies minuta Poir.
Abies montana Nyman
Abies parvula Knight
Abies subarctica (Schur) Nyman
Abies viminalis Wahlenb.
Picea alpestris (Brügger) Stein
Picea cranstonii Beissn.
Picea elegantissima Beissn.
Picea excelsa (Lam.) Link
Picea finedonensis Beissn.
Picea gregoryana Beissn.
Picea integrisquamis (Carrière) Chiov.
Picea maxwellii Beissn.
Picea montana Schur
Picea remontii Beissn.
Picea rubra A. Dietr.
Picea subarctica Schur
Picea velebitica Simonk. ex Kümmerle
Picea viminalis (Alstr.) Beissn.
Picea vulgaris Link
Pinus excelsa Lam.
Pinus sativa Lam.
Pinus viminalis Alstr.

See also 
List of Lepidoptera that feed on spruces
Pinus resinosa Norway pine

References

External links 

 Spruce Genome Project at Congenie.org
 Picea abies - distribution map, genetic conservation units and related resources. European Forest Genetic Resources Programme (EUFORGEN)

abies
Flora of Belarus
Flora of Bulgaria
Flora of Croatia
Flora of the Czech Republic
Flora of Estonia
Flora of Germany
Flora of Italy
Flora of Latvia
Flora of Lithuania
Flora of Poland
Flora of Moldova
Flora of Romania
Flora of Serbia
Flora of Slovakia
Flora of Slovenia
Flora of Ukraine
Flora of the Alps
Flora of Northern Europe
Least concern plants
Plants described in 1753
Taxa named by Carl Linnaeus
Trees of continental subarctic climate
Trees of humid continental climate
Trees of subpolar oceanic climate
Trees of Europe
Trees of Russia